Cusco Fútbol Club (known as Real Garcilaso until 2019) is a professional Peruvian football club based in the city of Cusco, that competes in the Liga 1, the top flight of Peruvian football.

History

Beginnings
The club was founded in 2009 by students of the Inca Garcilaso de la Vega school, in that year Real Garcilaso played the second division in Cusco. Real Garcilaso got to the finals where they defeated Cienciano and went up to first division of Cusco.

In the 2010 Copa Perú, the club qualified for the National Stage but was eliminated by Sportivo Huracán de Arequipa in the Round of 16.

In the 2011 Torneo Intermedio, the club was eliminated by Sport Áncash in the quarter-finals.

In the 2011 Copa Perú, the club defeated Pacífico in the finals and was promoted to the 2012 Torneo Descentralizado.

Primera División
In the 2012 Torneo Descentralizado, the club had a successful campaign with Andy Pando who was the tournament's top goal scorer, and made it to the final where it was defeated by Sporting Cristal. It also qualified for the 2013 Copa Libertadores second round. In 2013, They reached the final for the second year in a row and qualified for the 2014 Copa Libertadores after finishing as the top club during the tournament's first stage. In the Liguilla A, the club fought against Sporting Cristal for a spot in the finals which they played against Universitario. After winning at home and losing away, a third match was played in which they lost the play-offs 4–5 on penalties.

On 23 December 2019, Real Garcilaso announced its name change to Cusco Fútbol Club.

In the 2021 Liga 1, the team finished next to last and was relegated to the Liga 2.

Copa Libertadores
In the 2013 Copa Libertadores, the club was eliminated by Santa Fe in the quarter-finals.

In the 2014 Copa Libertadores, according to Soccerly, Cruzeiro player Paulo César Fonseca do Nascimento (better known as Tinga) was subjected to racist abuse at the game against Real Garcilaso in Huancayo. The South American Football Federation (CONMEBOL) tweeted that the incident would be “handle this situation and any pertinent sanctions.”

Rivalries
Cusco FC has a rivalry with Cusco clubs Deportivo Garcilaso and Cienciano. The three clubs share the same home stadium.

Stadium

Cusco FC play their home games in Estadio Garcilaso de la Vega which is in Cusco. It was named after the Peruvian Inca Garcilaso de la Vega. When first inaugurated in 1950, it had a spectator capacity of 22,000 and had a running track. In 2004, the stadium's capacity was expanded to 42,000, losing its running track, because of Cienciano's success in international tournaments and it would be a venue in the 2004 Copa América. The team also plays some games at Estadio Túpac Amaru in Sicuani.

The club's current training ground is at the Complejo Deportivo in Oropesa, approximately 25 Km east of Cusco.

Honours

National

League
Peruvian Primera División:
Runner-up (3): 2012, 2013, 2017

Torneo Apertura: 
Runner-up (1): 2017

Torneo Clausura:
Runner-up (2): 2015, 2017

Peruvian Segunda División:
Winners (1): 2022

Copa Perú:
Winners (1): 2011

Regional
Región VIII:
Winners (1): 2011
Runner-up (1): 2010

Liga Departamental de Cusco:
Winners (1): 2010

Liga Provincial del Cusco:
Winners (1): 2010

Liga Distrital del Cusco:
Winners (1): 2010

Performance in CONMEBOL competitions

A = appearances, P = matches played, W = won, D = drawn, L = lost, GF = goals for, GA = goals against.

Current squad

Managers
 Roberto Arrelucea (Jan 1, 2010–Dec 20, 2010)
 Freddy García (Jan 1, 2011–14)
 Luis Flores (2014)
 Mariano Soso (2015)
 Tabaré Silva (2015)
 Jorge Espejo (2016)
 Wilmar Valencia (2016)
 Duilio Cisneros (2017)
 Gustavo Coronel (2017)
 Marcelo Grioni (2017)
 Óscar Ibáñez (2018)
 Tabaré Silva (2018)
 Victor Reyes (2018)

See also
List of football clubs in Peru
Peruvian football league system

References

External links

Football clubs in Peru
Association football clubs established in 2009